Cristino Seriche Bioko (born 1940) is an Equatoguinean soldier and politician who was the prime minister of Equatorial Guinea from 15 August 1982 to 4 March 1992. He was Second Vice President from December 1981 to 1982. He is a member of the Bubi people.

References

1940 births
African military personnel
Bubi people
Living people
Prime Ministers of Equatorial Guinea
Vice presidents of Equatorial Guinea